Aodh Ua Beacháin (d. 1188) was Bishop of Iniscathay in the late 12th century.

The surname is now rendered Behan

References 

1188 deaths
12th-century Roman Catholic bishops in Ireland
Bishops of Iniscathay